Paranã (formerly known as São João da Palma) is a municipality in the state of Tocantins in the Northern region of Brazil.

See also
List of municipalities in Tocantins

References 

Municipalities in Tocantins